Francisco Sanjuanena was the governor of Ceuta from 1836 to 1837.

19th-century Spanish politicians
Date of birth missing
Date of death missing